District 9 of the Oregon State Senate comprises eastern Marion and Linn counties, as well as southern Clackamas County. It is currently represented by Republican Fred Girod of Molalla.

Election results
District boundaries have changed over time, therefore, senators before 2013 may not represent the same constituency as today. From 1993 until 2003, the district covered parts of east Portland, and from 2003 until 2013 it covered a slightly different area in the Willamette Valley.

References

09
Clackamas County, Oregon
Linn County, Oregon
Marion County, Oregon